Playground Battle is the third album by New Zealand Rock Band The Feelers. It includes the number-one hits: "Larger Than Life" and "The Fear". Other singles include "Playground Battle", "Supernova" and "Stand Up". Since its release, a second version, The Special Limited Edition, was released including a seven-track bonus disc including five re-mastered live tracks recorded from the bands hugely popular 2005 New Zealand tour. The album climbed to over three times platinum on New Zealand music charts.

Track listing 
All songs written by James Reid, except tracks 1 & 5;written by James Reid & Donald Reid.
 Weapons Of War – 4:14
 Playground Battle – 3:22
 Larger Than Life – 3:37
 The Fear – 4:59
 Fallout Shelter – 4:17
 Labyrinth – 2:30
 Supernova – 3:54
 All Connected – 4:33
 Rain – 3:35
 Emotional Allstar – 3:56
 Military Precision – 3:06
 Unleash The Fury – 4:40
 Stand Up – 4:00

Special Limited Edition Bonus Disc 

 Weapons Of War [Live]
 Pressure Man [Live]
 As Good As It Gets [Live]
 Larger Than Life [Live]
 Venus [Live]
 Dancing On Water
 Eyes Of The World

External links 
 Smokecds.co.nz - Buy the CD
 Amplifier.co.nz - Playground Battle

2003 albums
The Feelers albums
Albums produced by Greg Haver